Rákoš is a village and municipality in Revúca District in the Banská Bystrica Region of Slovakia. The closest major city is Jelšava.

Population and demographics 
Rákoš has a population of 246 of which 56% are male and 44% are female. The median age is 37.1 years. The HDI is 0.839.

Mining 
The region in which Rákoš is in sits on deposits of Iron and Mercury.

References

External links
http://www.statistics.sk/mosmis/eng/run.html

Villages and municipalities in Revúca District